Ashke is a 2018 Indian-Punjabi film based on popular folk dance Bhangra and is written by Dheeraj Rattan and directed by Amberdeep Singh. It stars Amrinder Gill, Sanjeeda Shaikh, Roopi Gill in lead roles and Sarbjit Cheema, Hobby Dhaliwal, Jaswinder Bhalla, Avy Randhawa and Gurshabad in supporting roles. Also, the film marks as debut for Roopi Gill and Sanjeeda Shaikh in Pollywood.

Ashke was released worldwide on 27 July 2018. At Brit Asia TV Awards the film received six nominations including Best Film and Best Actor(Gill).

Plot

Pamma is in his late thirties living in Canada with his sister and her family. He is doing petty jobs but doesn't carry on for very long as he has bad temper and lack of subordination. He is struggling to live and find a direction in his life in contrast from the Pamma from 15 years back, who was full of life and hope.

He was a passionate Bhangra dancer and was the star performer of Khalsa College, Amritsar. But things didn't work out the way he had hoped and after breaking ties with his college team, with the love of his life and his father, his sister gave him a sanctuary in her home as she loves him unconditionally.

But now at an unexpected juncture his sister's kid Ekam finds out about his dance talent and the kids are in dire need of his help. This equation brings him closer to kids and his long-lost passion but also, he comes across his lost love/Jia, in a very vulnerable situation. Pamma finds the emotions he had covered up deep in his heart for all these years.

Cast
Amrinder Gill as Pamma
Sanjeeda Sheikh as Jiya
Jaswinder Bhalla as Pritam Singh Pandori
Sarbjit Cheema as Vikram
 Hobby Dhaliwal as Dhaliwal Saab
 Gurshabad as Gogaa
 Roopi Gill as Noor
 Hardeep Gill as Pamma's father
 Avy Randhawa as Preet, Pamma's sister
 Sehaj Sahib as Agam
 Harjot Sandhu as Ekam
 Amberdeep Singh as Noor's brother (cameo appearance)
 Vandana Chopra as Jiya's mother
 Jatinder Kaur as Jiya's grandmother
 Harish Verma as Jiya's husband (cameo appearance)

Soundtrack

Track List

Release

Amrinder Gill announced the name and release date of Ashke on Instagram on his birthday, 11 May 2018. Ashke was released worldwide on 27 July 2018. The first look poster was released on 9 July 2018 and a trailer was released the night before its release date. The film was theatrically released on 27 July 2018. Major releases includes India, Canada, United States and Australia. The film was digitally released on 15 November 2018 on YouTube by Rhythm Boyz and was premiered first time on television on 23 December 2018 on PTC Punjabi.

Reception

Box office
Ashke had grossed $379,988(₹2.6 crores) in Australia, in New Zealand film grossed 53.68 lacs whereas ₹1.27 crores in United States and ₹5.94 crores in Canada in its 7 week long theatrical run making a worldwide total of ₹18 crores.

Critical reception
 The Tribune - the critical reviews of 3.5 out of 5 stars

 Dekh News - the critical reviews of 3.5 out of 5 stars

References

External links
 Ashke Trailer
 

Punjabi-language Indian films
2010s Punjabi-language films
Indian romantic drama films
Films shot in Punjab, India
Films scored by Jatinder Shah
Films shot in Canada